Nick Osborn (born November 21, 1984) is a former American football linebacker. He was signed by the Chicago Bears as an undrafted free agent in 2008. He played college football at San Diego State.

Professional career

Chicago Bears
After going undrafted in the 2008 NFL Draft, Osborn signed with the Chicago Bears as an undrafted free agent. He was waived during final cuts on August 30.

California Redwoods
After spending the 2008 season out of football, Osborn was signed by the California Redwoods of the United Football League on August 18, 2009.

References

External links
Chicago Bears bio
San Diego State Aztecs bio

1984 births
Living people
Players of American football from Berkeley, California
American football defensive ends
American football linebackers
San Diego State Aztecs football players
Chicago Bears players
Sacramento Mountain Lions players